Hospital-Herbertstown is a Gaelic Athletic Association hurling and football club in County Limerick, Ireland, and is based in the South Division.

Hospital-Herbertstown competed in the County Senior Hurling Championship in 2011 following the club's victory in the 2010 County Intermediate Hurling Championship. The club competes in the Limerick Intermediate Football Championship also. Some Hospital-Herbertstown players that have represented Limerick include former captain Damien Reale as well as Jimmy Carroll, Liam Garvey, Andy Garvey and Colm Hickey.

Hospital-Herbertstown - Limerick Intermediate Hurling Champions 2010

Honours 
 Limerick Intermediate Hurling Championship (3) Winners 1929, 2000, 2010
 Limerick Intermediate Football Championship (2) 1977, 1989
 Limerick Junior Hurling Championship (2) 1983, 2005
 Limerick Junior Football Championship (2) 1975, 1983
 Limerick Under-21 Football Championship (3) 1976, 1977, 2005
 Limerick Under-21 Hurling Championship (4) 2006, 2009, 2010, 2018
 Limerick Minor Hurling Championship (2) 1933, 2011
 Limerick Minor Football Championship (3) 1988, 1989, 1993
 Limerick Under-16 Hurling Championship (3) 1968, 1994, 1997
 Limerick Under-16 Football Championship (2) 1988, 1991
 Limerick Under-14 Hurling Championship (1) 1989
 Limerick Under-14 Football Championship (1) 1986
 Limerick Under-13 Hurling Championship (1) 2010
 Limerick Under-12 Football Championship (1) 1987
 Limerick Junior Hurling League (1) 1983
 Limerick Senior Football League (1) 1992
 Limerick Intermediate Hurling League (1) 1990

Notable players
 Jimmy Carroll
 Damien Reale

References

External links
Official Hospital Herbertstown Club website

Gaelic games clubs in County Limerick
Hurling clubs in County Limerick
Gaelic football clubs in County Limerick